Almaly (Almalı) is a rural locality (a village) in Petrovsky Selsoviet, Ishimbaysky District, Bashkortostan, Russia. The population was 73 as of 2010. There is 1 street.

Geography 
Almaly is located 45 km northeast of Ishimbay (the district's administrative centre) by road. Vasilyevka is the nearest rural locality.

References 

Rural localities in Ishimbaysky District